Eric Henderson is an American basketball coach. He currently coaches the South Dakota State Jackrabbits men's basketball team.

Playing career
Henderson played college basketball at Wayne State College in Nebraska under Greg McDermott where he registered 876 rebounds and 160 career steals. He was inducted into the Wayne State College Athletic Hall of Fame in 2008.

Coaching career
After graduation, Henderson joined the coaching staff of his alma mater from 2001 to 2003. He would then enter the high school ranks as the girls basketball coach at Wayne High School until 2005. He then joined the Iowa State men's basketball program as a graduate manager and learning specialist under McDermott. Henderson would return to coaching high school in 2009 and spent five seasons as the head boys basketball coach at Burlington Catholic Central High School, while also serving as the school's athletic director and principal. In 2014, Henderson joined the staff at North Dakota State, and was part of the Bison's 2015 NCAA tournament squad. Two years later, Henderson would join conference rival South Dakota State's coaching staff, rising to associate head coach.

On March 27, 2019 Henderson was named the 22nd head coach in Jackrabbits history, replacing T. J. Otzelberger who accepted the head coaching position at UNLV. After leading the Jackrabbits to a 13-3 conference record in his first season, Henderson was named Summit League coach of the year.

Head coaching record

References

Year of birth missing (living people)
Living people
American men's basketball coaches
College men's basketball head coaches in the United States
High school basketball coaches in Nebraska
High school basketball coaches in Wisconsin
North Dakota State Bison men's basketball coaches
South Dakota State Jackrabbits men's basketball coaches
Wayne State Wildcats men's basketball coaches
Wayne State Wildcats men's basketball players